Kailasanathar Temple, Brahmadesam, also known as Ayaniccuram  is a Siva temple in Ambasamudram Taluk of Thirunelveli District in Tamil Nadu (India).  It is one of the shrines of the Vaippu Sthalams sung by Tamil Saivite Nayanar Appar.

Structure of the temple 
The presiding deity of the temple is known as Kailasanathar. His consort is known as Periya Nayaki Ammal. Other shrines in this temple are Vinayaka, Subramania and Sarasvathi.

Pujas and festivals 
Pujas are held four times daily. Panguni Uthiram festival is celebrated in this temple.

References

External links
பிரம்மதேசம் கைலாசநாதர் கோயில் காணொளி, Video about the temple
 Muvar Thevara Vaippu Thalangal, மூவர் தேவார வைப்புத்தலங்கள்,  ayanIccuram, Sl.No.10 of 139 temples
 Shiva Temples, தேவார வைப்புத்தலங்கள், அயனீச்சுரம், Sl.No.8 of 133 temples, page1

Hindu temples in Tirunelveli district